This is a list of non-binary characters in fiction, i.e. fictional characters that either self-identify as non-binary (or genderqueer) or have been identified by outside parties as such. Listed are agender, bigender, genderfluid, genderqueer, and other characters of non-binary gender, as well as characters of any third gender.

For more information about fictional characters in other parts of the LGBTQ community, see the lists of lesbian (with sub-pages for characters in anime and animation), bisexual (with sub-sections for characters in anime and animation), gay, pansexual, trans, asexual, and intersex characters.

The names are organized alphabetically by surname (i.e. last name), or by single name if the character does not have a surname. If more than two characters are in one entry, the last name of the first character is used.

Anime and animation

Books, print comics, and manga

Film

Live-action television

Theatre

Video games

Webcomics

Other

See also 

 List of animated series with LGBT characters
 List of fictional polyamorous characters
 List of comedy television series with LGBT characters
 List of dramatic television series with LGBT characters: 1960s–2000s
 List of dramatic television series with LGBT characters: 2010–2015
 List of dramatic television series with LGBT characters: 2016–2019
 List of dramatic television series with LGBT characters: 2020s
 List of people with non-binary gender identities
 List of LGBT characters in television and radio
 List of tomboys in fiction
 Lists of LGBT figures in fiction and myth

Notes

References

Citations

Sources
 

Fictional LGBT characters
non-binary
Fictional, non-binary
Non-binary gender
Fictional non-binary people